Udzorong Gewog (Dzongkha: ཨུ་མཛོ་རོང་) is one of the gewogs (village block) under Trashigang District, Bhutan.

Chiwogs

References

Gewogs of Bhutan
Trashigang District